The Men's 100m athletics events for the 2012 Summer Paralympics took place at the London Olympic Stadium from August 31 to September 8. A total of 15 events were contested over this distance for 15 different classifications.

Schedule

Results

T11

Final

T12

Final

T13

Heats took place on 31 August 2012. Jason Smyth broke his own world record in 10.54, while Jonathan Ntutu broke the African record.

The final took place on 1 September 2012. Jason Smyth of Ireland won gold in a new world record time of 10.46. Luis Felipe Gutierrez took silver for his second medal of the  Games, with the South African Ntutu just clinching bronze.

Final

T34

Final

T35

Final

T36

Final

T37

Final

T38

Final

No heats were held.

The final was won in a new world record of 10.79 seconds by Evan O'Hanlon of Australia.

T42

Final

T44

Heats took place on 5 September 2012. In the final, Jonnie Peacock of the UK won the Gold with a time of 10.90 seconds, Richard Browne of the USA won the Silver with a time of 11.03 seconds and Arnu Fourie of the RSA won the Bronze with a time of 11.08.

Final

T46

Final

T51

There were no heats for this event. The final was competed on 3 September 2012 at 19:10.

Final

T52

Final

T53

Final

T54

Final

References

Athletics at the 2012 Summer Paralympics
2012
2012 in men's athletics